Jaunogre Secondary School (Latvian: Jaunogres vidusskola) is the only educational establishment available for ethnic minorities in Ogre District with Russian as a teaching language.

History 
School was founded in 1972.

On February 8, 2018, Jaunogre Secondary School celebrated its 45th anniversary.

Management and staff

Principals 
 1972–1980 – Aleksandrs Grišins
 1980–1985 – Leonīds Sorokins
 1986–1991 – Ņina Vaškevica
 1991–2016 – Ludmila Sokolova
 2017–2020 – Aleksandrs Horuženko

Facilities 
Since 1992 classes are being held in two separate buildings located close to each other. One of which is used to be pre-school institution "Kamoliņš". Now in this building there are 1-4 classes but in the other 5-12 classes.

Museum 
The school has its own museum in the school's building. It has gathered most important moments in school's life and historical events. For this purpose, the coterie "My school's history" was made. The group is led by Latvian language teacher Gaida Zeibote. She has created several exhibitions in the museum devoted to school's history, including photos and readable information about school principals and photos from important moments, projects and events.

References

Schools in Latvia
Educational institutions established in 1972
1972 establishments in Latvia